Joe T. Cawthorn (October 1, 1911 – November 11, 1967) was an American politician. He served as a Democratic member of the Louisiana State Senate.

Cawthorn was born in Selma, Grant Parish, Louisiana. He graduated from Oak Grove High School, and attended Louisiana State University, where he earned a law degree in 1932. After earning his law degree, Cawthorn became active in Louisiana politics, and was a friend of Huey Long and his son, Russell.

In 1940 Cawthorn was elected to the Louisiana State Senate, serving until 1944. Cawthorn practised as an attorney in Mansfield, Louisiana, but was disbarred in 1953 as a result of a 1948 conviction for jury tampering. In the 1960s, Cawthorn represented rodeo performer Jack Favor when he was falsely accused of murder.

Cawthorn died in November 1967 at a hospital in Lake Charles, Louisiana. He was pronounced dead at 5:32pm.

References 

1911 births
1967 deaths
People from Grant Parish, Louisiana
Louisiana lawyers
Democratic Party Louisiana state senators
20th-century American politicians
20th-century American lawyers
Louisiana State University alumni
Prisoners and detainees of the United States federal government